is one of ten wards of the city of Saitama, in Saitama Prefecture, Japan, and is located in the northern part of the city. , the ward had an estimated population of 163,869 and a population density of 5300 persons per km².

Geography
Mimuna-ward is located in the northern side of the city of Saitama.

Neighboring Municipalities
Saitama Prefecture
Iwatsuki-ku
Midori-ku
Urawa-ku
Kita-ku
Ōmiya-ku
Ageo
Hasuda

History
The villages of Katayanagi and Ōsato were created within Kitaadachi District, Saitama with the establishment of the municipalities system on April 1, 1889. The village of Haruoka was created in 1892 and the village of Nanasato in 1912. On November 3, 1930 the village of Ōsato was merged with Ōmiya Town in 1940, becoming part of the city of Ōmiya. On January 1, 1955, Ōmiya annexed Katayanagi, Haruoka, and Nanasato. On May 1, 2001, Ōmiya merged with Urawa and Yono cities to form the new city of Saitama.  When Saitama was proclaimed a designated city in 2003, this area of former Ōmiya city became Minuma Ward.

Education
Shibaura Institute of Technology
Minuma-ku has eleven elementary schools, seven junior high schools, and three high schools.

Municipal junior high schools:

 Haruno (春野中学校)
 Harusato (春里中学校)
 Katayanagi (片柳中学校)
 Nanasato (七里中学校)
 Omiya Yahata (大宮八幡中学校)
 Osato (大砂土中学校)
 Oya (大谷中学校)

Municipal elementary schools:

 Ebinuma (海老沼小学校)
 Haruno (春野小学校)
 Haruoka (春岡小学校)
 Hasunuma (蓮沼小学校)
 Higashi Miyashita (東宮下小学校)
 Katayanagi (片柳小学校)
 Minuma (見沼小学校)
 Nanasato (七里小学校)
 Osato Higashi (大砂土東小学校)
 Oya (大谷小学校)
 Shima (島小学校)

Transportation

Railway
 JR East – Utsunomiya Line
 
 Tōbu Railway - Tōbu Urban Park Line
  -

Highway
   Shuto Expressway Saitama Shintoshin Route

Local attractions
, referring to a vast green area of nearly 1260 hectares left within 20 to 30 kilometers from central Tokyo.

References

External links

 

Wards of Saitama (city)